

Acts of the Scottish Parliament

|-
| {{|Budget (Scotland) Act 2008|asp|2|12-03-2008|maintained=y|archived=n|An Act of the Scottish Parliament to make provision, for financial year 2008/09, for the use of resources by the Scottish Administration and certain bodies whose expenditure is payable out of the Scottish Consolidated Fund, for authorising the payment of sums out of the Fund and for the maximum amounts of borrowing by certain statutory bodies; to make provision, for financial year 2009/10, for authorising the payment of sums out of the Fund on a temporary basis; and for connected purposes.}}
|-
| {{|Graduate Endowment Abolition (Scotland) Act 2008|asp|3|04-04-2008|maintained=y|archived=n|An Act of the Scottish Parliament to abolish the graduate endowment; and for connected purposes.}}
|-
| {{|Glasgow Commonwealth Games Act 2008|asp|4|10-06-2008|maintained=y|archived=n|An Act of the Scottish Parliament to make provision in relation to the Commonwealth Games that are to be held principally in Glasgow in 2014.}}
|-
| {{|Public Health etc. (Scotland) Act 2008|asp|5|16-07-2008|maintained=y|archived=n|An Act of the Scottish Parliament to restate and amend the law on public health; to make provision about mortuaries and the disposal of bodies; to enable the Scottish Ministers to implement their obligations under the International Health Regulations; to make provision relating to the use, sale or hire of sunbeds; to amend the law on statutory nuisances; and for connected purposes.}}
|-
| {{|Judiciary and Courts (Scotland) Act 2008|asp|6|29-10-2008|maintained=y|archived=n|An Act of the Scottish Parliament to make provision about the judiciary and the courts; to establish the Scottish Court Service; and for connected purposes.}}
|-
| {{|Scottish Register of Tartans Act 2008|asp|7|13-11-2008|maintained=y|archived=n|An Act of the Scottish Parliament to establish a register of tartans; and for connected purposes.}}
}}

See also
List of Acts of the Scottish Parliament

References
Current Law Statutes Annotated 2008

2008